Robert Henry Bow FRSE (1827–1909) was a Scottish civil engineer and photographer.

Life
He was born in Alnwick on 27 January 1827.

Bow worked with Edward Sang and Thomas Bouch, and his textbooks Economics of Construction in Relation to Framed Structures (1871) and Treatise on Bracing in relation to Bridges and other Structures (1874) drew on calculations he had conducted for Bouch.

In the 1860s he became fascinated with stereoscopic photography.

He was elected a Fellow of the Royal Society of Edinburgh in 1869, his proposer being Edward Sang His address was then 7 South Gray Street on the south side of Edinburgh.

He died at 7 South Gray Street on 17 February 1909 is buried in the grave of his brother Dr John Campbell Bow (1825–1877) in the Grange Cemetery in southern Edinburgh. The grave lies on the main east–west spine of the south-east section.

References

See also
 Tay Bridge disaster

1832 births
1908 deaths
19th-century Scottish people
People from Alnwick
Fellows of the Royal Society of Edinburgh
Scottish civil engineers
Scottish photographers
Burials at the Grange Cemetery